Ninjemys oweni ("Owen's Ninja Turtle") is an extinct large meiolaniid stem-turtle from Pleistocene Queensland (Australia).  It resembled its relative, Meiolania, save that the largest pair of horns on its head stuck out to the sides, rather than point backwards. It is only known from a mostly complete skull and the distal portion of a tail.

Discovery and taxonomy
 
The remains of Ninjemys were found at the King's Creek locality in Queensland in 1879 by G. F. Bennett, an Australian collector. The King's Creek deposit is believed to be of Pleistocene age, though the precise dating is uncertain. Despite the fact that Bennett correctly identified the remains as that of a turtle, when they were sent to the Natural History Museum, Richard Owen mixed up the remains with the vertebrae of Megalania, and subsequently with the foot bones of Diprotodon. He later described better remains of the related genus Meiolania from Lord Howe Island, so it was realised that this first known meiolaniid was actually a turtle. It was subsequently described by A. S. Woodward as Meiolania oweni. Woodward (1888) notes that "In 1881, a tail, completely sheathed in bony armour like that of Glyptodon, was found at the same spot in King's Creek whence had been obtained [the Ninjemys holotype skull]". Gafney (1992) notes that this consists of a "tail club and single tail ring", this is assumed to belong to the holotype individual. In 1992, anatomical differences with the type species M. platyceps led to its placement in the new genus Ninjemys, which was named in honor of the Teenage Mutant Ninja Turtles. The paper explained the etymology as "Ninja, in allusion to that totally rad, fearsome foursome epitomizing shelled success; emys, turtle." 

Like other meiolaniids, N. oweni is believed to have been an herbivore.

References

Pleistocene reptiles of Australia
Meiolaniformes
Prehistoric turtle genera
Taxa named by Eugene S. Gaffney
Teenage Mutant Ninja Turtles
Extinct turtles
Monotypic prehistoric reptile genera